Handle with Care is a 1985 Australian television film directed by Paul Cox and starring Luncinda Cowden and Anna Maria Monticelli. The screenplay concerns two women with breast cancer.

References

External links

1985 television films
1985 films
Australian television films
1980s English-language films